Brayden Irwin (born March 24, 1987) is Canadian former professional ice hockey centre who played 2 games for the Toronto Maple Leafs in the National Hockey League (NHL).

Playing career
Irwin grew up in Toronto, Ontario playing minor hockey for the AA North Toronto program in the Yonge-Eglinton area of the city. He went to high school at Upper Canada College in Toronto, a member of Bremner's house. Irwin's family were the founders of the Irwin Toy Corporation. Irwin was selected in the 2003 OHL Draft out of AA hockey by the Brampton Battalion.  He chose to pursue an NCAA scholarship and eventually signed with the St. Michael's Buzzers Jr.A. club of the OHA.

He played hockey at the University of Vermont and in his senior year Irwin led Vermont in scoring during the 2009–10 season. Upon completion of his four-year collegiate career Irwin signed with the Toronto Maple Leafs on March 29, 2010. With the Leafs out of playoff contention, Irwin immediately made his NHL debut at the end of the 2009–10 season on April 1, 2010.

In the final year of his entry level contract with the Leafs, due to injury and lack of form Irwin was reassigned to ECHL affiliate the Reading Royals by the Toronto Maple Leafs on November 11, 2011. After one game with the Royals, Irwin was then loaned to ECHL rival the Florida Everblades for the remainder of the season, where he became instrumental in helping capture the Kelly Cup.

On September 5, 2012, he was re-signed to a one-year ECHL contract with the Everblades.

Career statistics

Regular season and playoffs

Awards and honours

References

External links

1987 births
Living people
Canadian ice hockey centres
Cowichan Valley Capitals players
Elmira Jackals (ECHL) players
Florida Everblades players
Greenville Road Warriors players
Ice hockey people from Toronto
Norfolk Admirals players
Reading Royals players
Rochester Americans players
Stockton Thunder players
Toronto Maple Leafs players
Toronto Marlies players
Undrafted National Hockey League players
Upper Canada College alumni
Utica Comets players
Vermont Catamounts men's ice hockey players
Canadian expatriate ice hockey players in the United States